Randal Crowder (born July 12, 1950) is an American politician who has served in the New Mexico House of Representatives to 2015 to 2023, where he represented the 64th district.

References

1950 births
Living people
Republican Party members of the New Mexico House of Representatives
21st-century American politicians